Syed Rahman Shino is a Pakistani actor, host and stand-up comedian.

Career
Shino used to drive a rickshaw in Peshawar, one day he was searching for riders when encountered by Peshawar Radio officials and took him to the studio and started working. Shino performed for long time alongside Ismail Shahid. He is also co-host of Sheeno Meeno Show at AVT Khyber.

He has performed in many pushto pakistani dramas and films tribute to him. He currently hosts Shino meeno show on avt khyber. His grandson name is Umar khan and Behram Khan.

Awards
 Tamgha-e-Imtiaz (2012)
 Fakhar-e-Peshawar (2017)

See also
Mirawas
Ismail Shahid

References

Living people
Pakistani male comedians
Pakistani stand-up comedians
Pashtun people
Recipients of Tamgha-e-Imtiaz
21st-century Pakistani male actors
Year of birth missing (living people)